Ferdinand von Alten (born Baron von Lamezan auf Altenhofen; 13 April 1885 – 16 March 1933) was a Russian-born German actor.

Selected filmography

 The Blue Lantern (1918)
 Madame Récamier (1920)
 Anna Boleyn (1920)
 Catherine the Great (1920)
 The Girl from Acker Street (1920)
 The Secret of the Mummy (1921)
 The Pearl of the Orient (1921)
 Danton (1921)
 The Bull of Olivera (1921)
 The Hunt for the Truth (1921)
 Peter Voss, Thief of Millions (1921)
 Roswolsky's Mistress (1921)
 The Earl of Essex (1922)
 Othello (1922)
 The Love Story of Cesare Ubaldi (1922)
 The Money Devil (1923)
 The Flame (1923)
 The Merchant of Venice (1923)
 Man Against Man (1924)
 Tragedy in the House of Habsburg (1924)
 Countess Donelli (1924)
 Wallenstein (1925)
 The Dice Game of Life (1925)
 Struggle for the Soil (1925)
 Chamber Music (1925)
 Fadette (1926)
 My Friend the Chauffeur (1926)
 The Flames Lie (1926)
 Fräulein Mama (1926)
 The Master of Death (1926)
 The Son of Hannibal (1926)
 The Student of Prague (1926)
 Queen of the Boulevards (1927)
 German Women - German Faithfulness (1927)
 Benno Stehkragen (1927)
 The Queen of Spades (1927)
 Luther (1928)
 Sajenko the Soviet (1928)
 Vienna, City of My Dreams (1928)
 The Woman on the Rack (1928)
 Queen Louise (1928)
 Champagne (1928)
 Ludwig II, King of Bavaria (1929)
 Roses Bloom on the Moorland (1929)
 Hocuspocus (1930)
 Police Spy 77 (1930)
 1914 (1931)
 The Theft of the Mona Lisa (1931)
 Ash Wednesday (1931)
 Wibbel the Tailor (1931)
 Marshal Forwards (1932)
 Secret Agent (1932)
 The Mad Bomberg (1932)
 Countess Mariza (1932)
 The Pride of Company Three (1932)
 Things Are Getting Better Already (1932)
 This One or None (1932)
 Three from the Unemployment Office (1932)
 The First Right of the Child (1932)

Bibliography
 Jung, Uli & Schatzberg, Walter. Beyond Caligari: The Films of Robert Wiene. Berghahn Books, 1999.

External links

1885 births
1933 deaths
German male film actors
German male silent film actors
Male actors from Saint Petersburg
Emigrants from the Russian Empire to the German Empire
20th-century German male actors
Barons of Germany